The 42nd News and Documentary Emmy Awards were presented by the National Academy of Television Arts and Sciences (NATAS), to honor the best in American news and documentary programming in 2020. The winners were announced on two ceremonies via live-stream at Watch.TheEmmys.TV and other apps associated, the winners for the News categories were announced on September 28, 2021, while the ones for the Documentary categories were revealed on September 29, 2021.

The nominees were announced on July 27, 2021, with CBS's news magazine 60 Minutes and Vice's news program VICE News Tonight leading the nominations with 16 each while PBS was the most nominated network with 52.

Winners and nominees
The nominations were announced on July 27, 2021.

News Programming

Spanish Language Programming

Documentary Programming

Craft

Regional News

Multiple nominations

Notes

References

External links
 News & Documentary Emmys website

News and Documentary Emmy Awards
Emmy Awards
News & Documentary Emmy Awards